Carole Couesnon (born 13 May 1975) is a French sports shooter. She competed in the women's 10 metre air rifle event at the 1996 Summer Olympics.

References

External links
 

1975 births
Living people
French female sport shooters
Olympic shooters of France
Shooters at the 1996 Summer Olympics
Sportspeople from Val-de-Marne
20th-century French women